Michael Fusek (born June 5, 1995) is a Slovak professional basketball player. He stands 2.24 m (7’4’’) tall and plays center. He was projected by some media outlets to be a potential 2017 NBA draft pick.

Career 
Fusek left his native Slovakia in 2012 to sign with Belgian powerhouse Spirou Charleroi. In his first two years with the club, Fusek played for Charleroi’s development team in the third Belgian division and their under 21 youth squad. He played his first minutes in Belgium’s top-flight and in the Eurocup during the 2014-15 season, while continuing to gain playing time in the reserves. In June 2016, he attended the Adidas Eurocamp in Treviso, Italy. An early entry candidate for the 2016 NBA draft, he later opted to withdraw his name.

In the off-seasons of 2015 and 2016, Fusek went to Rockville, Maryland, to work with trainer Blair O'Donovan, a strength and conditioning specialist. His main objective there was to gain muscle. He left Charleroi in 2018 and moved to BK Inter Bratislava.

In August 2022, he was announced as a newcomer at Spišskí Rytieri, also of the Slovak Basketball League.

Personal life 
Fusek's mother was also a professional basketball player.

See also 
 List of tallest people

External links 
 Profile at eurobasket.com
 Profile at fiba.com
 Spirou Charleroi profile
 Profile at nbadraft.net

References 

1995 births
Living people
Centers (basketball)
Slovak men's basketball players
Spirou Charleroi players